PJ Banville is a Gaelic footballer from County Wexford, Ireland. He plays with the Wexford inter-county team and his club side Horeswood. 

He was part of the Wexford side in 2008 that proved to be a very successful year for the county. Wexford won Division 3 of the National League, beating Fermanagh in the final. Having beaten Meath and Laois, they reached that year's Leinster Championship final, but were comprehensively beaten by Dublin. 

However subsequent victories over Down and Armagh, meant Wexford reached the All-Ireland semi-final. In the semi-final they lost to eventual All-Ireland champions Tyrone.  

He also played soccer with Waterford United F.C.

References

Year of birth missing (living people)
Living people
Horeswood Gaelic footballers
Horeswood hurlers
Wexford inter-county Gaelic footballers
Waterford F.C. players
Gaelic footballers who switched code
Association football forwards
Republic of Ireland association footballers